The Tirana Stock Exchange is the principal stock exchange in Albania. It is located in the capital city, Tirana. Its name is abbreviated as TSE. The general manager of the stock exchange is Anila Fureraj.

History
The TSE began operations as a department of Albania's central bank, the Bank of Albania, in 1996, concurrent with the establishment of the Albanian Securities Commission, with a full membership in the Federation of Euro-Asian Stock Exchanges (FEAS). The market functioned as a department of the central bank until it was spun off as an independent entity in 2002. It is not currently functional as it has been shut down since 2014.

See also
Economy of Albania
List of stock exchanges
List of European stock exchanges

References

External links
History of the exchange
Albania Chamber of Commerce

Stock exchanges in Europe
Buildings and structures in Tirana